Beijing Yanqi Economic Development Area is a municipality-level economic development area located entirely within Yanqi Town, Huairou District, Beijing, China. In 2020, it had a total population of 3,261.

History 
The area was established in 1992 in a region 5 km northeast of the urban center of Huairou. In 2000 it became a municipality-level industrial development area.

Gallery

References 

Year of establishment missing
Economic And Technological Development Area
Economic And Technological Development Area
Special Economic Zones of China
Science and technology in the People's Republic of China
Township-level divisions of Beijing